Chilly Scenes of Winter  (originally released as Head over Heels) is a 1979 American romantic comedy film written and directed by Joan Micklin Silver, based on the 1976 novel of the same name by Ann Beattie. Although the film got mixed reviews and flopped at the box office upon its original release as Head Over Heals with an ad campaign that positioned it as am offbeat goofy comedy, the film had strong supporters that eventually led to a theatrical re-release in 1982 in a slightly edited version under the title of Beattie's novel. The film has been cited as a cult film by multiple cinematic sources.

Plot
Charles Richardson is a civil servant in his early 30s, working in the Department of Development in Salt Lake City, Utah, and he is an impetuous romantic. One day, he meets Laura Connolly in the filing department of his office, and it is love at first sight.

Laura is a married woman who has just moved out on her husband Jim, a log-home salesman. She is disillusioned by her own marriage and wants to find herself. Charles gathers his courage and asks her out. Soon, she moves in with him and seems happy, but starts having second thoughts. According to Laura, he loves her too much. "You have this exalted view of me, and I hate it. If you think I'm that great, then there must be something wrong with you."

Laura leaves Charles and goes back to her husband Jim. Sam, recently unemployed as a jacket salesman, moves in with Charles, who tries to grapple with the loss of Laura. Charles's mother, meanwhile, is an eccentric who has suicidal thoughts.

Charles begins to make efforts to win Laura back. Charles finds out from his secretary Betty that Laura has left Jim once again and is living in an apartment with a roommate. Charles confronts Laura, finally asking her to decide if they will have a future together.

Cast
 John Heard as Charles
 Mary Beth Hurt as Laura
 Peter Riegert as Sam
 Kenneth McMillan as Pete
 Gloria Grahame as Clara
 Nora Heflin as Betty
 Jerry Hardin as Patterson
 Tarah Nutter as Susan
 Mark Metcalf as Jim
 Griffin Dunne as Mark

Production
Producer Mark Metcalf says that United Artists, which financed the picture, offered to double the movie's $2.5 million budget to $5 million if John Heard was replaced by one of three actors (John Ritter, Robin Williams or Treat Williams). Metcalf and his fellow producers Griffin Dunne and Amy Robinson had always intended Heard to play the lead, and turned down the offer. Metcalf also said that Meryl Streep agreed to play the role of Laura, but only if Sam Waterston was cast as Charles. The proudcers, who did not have a casting director and cast the picture themselves along with director Joan Micklin Silver, cast Mary Beth Hurt instead since Streep would not act opposite Heard. The United Artists distribution people rejected the title Chilly Scenes of Winter and a joke title that Metcalf and the other producers suggested thinking it would be rejected, Head Over Heels, was accepted after 20th Century Fox would not surrender the rights of another proposed title, Laura, because it was the title of one of their classic films. 

Parts of the film were shot in Salt Lake City, Utah. According to director Silver, the producers would have filmed the movie in Albany, New York but the local movie unions' demands were economically prohibitive. 

Ann Beattie, who "loved" Silver's script, gave the producers an option for her book with the proviso that they give her a bit part in the movie. She was paid $26 for appearing as a waitress in a diner scene, not given dialogue as she would have had to be paid $225 for a speaking part.

Release
The original version of the film was titled Head over Heels on the insistence of United Artists, which financed and distributed the movie. The name change was protested by the film's crew members, who signed a petition to protest the change The Head Over Heels cut had a happy ending in which Laura reunited with Charles, which was in the Ann Beattie novel. 

In 1982, United Artists launched its United Artists Classics division that re-released it with a new melancholy ending (achieved by simply omitting the last scene), and the title was changed to match the novel. The film had a more successful run this time.

Reception
Reviewing the original version, Vincent Canby of The New York Times described the film as "seeming to be on the verge of some revelation of profound feeling that, at long last, never comes." However, he gave high praise to the acting, writing "there's not a false performance in the film." Leonard Maltin referred to the film as divisive: "it will either charm or annoy" the viewer. He awards it two-and-a-half stars, presumably the original version. Charles Champlin of the Los Angeles Times as “an intelligent and attractively acted, wry study of a human relationship." One of the print ads for the 1979 release quoted Champlin writing, "...it would be hard to invent...a more intimate film."

On review aggregator website, Rotten Tomatoes, the film holds a rating of 83%, based on 6 reviews, with an average rating of 6.6/10.

DVD Release
The Criterion Collection plans to release a Blu-ray of Chilly Scenes of Winter on March 28, 2023 with a newly restored 4K digital transfer.

References

External links
 
 
 
 
 Chilly Scenes of Winter at the TCM Movie Database

1979 films
1979 romantic comedy films
American romantic comedy films
Films based on American novels
Films directed by Joan Micklin Silver
Films scored by Ken Lauber
Films set in Utah
Films shot in Salt Lake City
Films shot in Utah
United Artists films
1970s English-language films
1970s American films